Kurchum is a district of East Kazakhstan Region in eastern Kazakhstan. The administrative center of the district is the selo of Kurshim. Population:

References

Districts of Kazakhstan
East Kazakhstan Region